Franklin Joshua Guerra Cedeño (born 12 April 1992) is an Ecuadorian footballer who plays for C.D. Universidad Católica on loan from L.D.U. Quito.

Club career
He began his career with El Nacional in 2010.

Career statistics

Honours
LDU Quito
Ecuadorian Serie A: 2018
Copa Ecuador: 2019
Supercopa Ecuador: 2020, 2021

References

1992 births
Living people
Association football midfielders
Ecuadorian footballers
Ecuadorian Serie A players
C.D. El Nacional footballers
L.D.U. Quito footballers
People from Portoviejo